The Sexual Politics of Meat: A Feminist-Vegetarian Critical Theory is a 1990 book by American author and activist Carol J. Adams published by Continuum. The book was first written as an essay for a college course taught by Mary Daly and includes material such as interviews from vegetarian feminists in the Boston–Cambridge area. The Sexual Politics of Meat has been translated into nine languages and re-published for its 25th anniversary edition as a part of the Bloomsbury Revelations series.

Reception

The Sexual Politics of Meat has been reviewed by multiple outlets, which includes the NWSA Journal, Etnofoor, and The Women's Review of Books. In a 2010 article for The Guardian, Nina Power wrote, "It's 20 years since The Sexual Politics of Meat was published, yet it is still as relevant as ever".

See also
 List of vegan media

References

1990 non-fiction books
Books about vegetarianism
Feminist books
Continuum International Publishing Group books